Space Icon is a collaborative album by Artemiy Artemiev and Peter Frohmader, released in March 2000 by Electroshock Records.

Track listing

Personnel 
Adapted from the Space Icon liner notes.
Musicians
 Artemiy Artemiev – synthesizer, musical arrangements, production, recording, engineering, mixing
 Peter Frohmader – fretless bass guitar, electric guitar, E-mu Emulator, PPG Wave synthesizer, gongs, musical arrangements, recording, engineering, mixing
Production and additional personnel
 Konstantin Galat – design
 Vladimir Krupnitskiy – production
 Boris Samoilov – mastering

Release history

References 

2000 albums
Collaborative albums
Artemiy Artemiev albums
Peter Frohmader albums